The 1957 Indian vice presidential election was held in 1957 to elect the Vice-President of India. Sarvepalli Radhakrishnan was reelected unopposed. Had the election been contested by more than one candidate, the poll would have occurred on 11 May 1957.

Schedule
The election schedule was announced by the Election Commission of India on 9 April 1957.

Result
The Electoral College consisted of 735 members of Lok Sabha and Rajya Sabha. Dr. Radhakrishnan was the only validly nominated candidate and hence he was declared as elected unopposed, to the office of the Vice-President on 23 April 1957. He started his second term on 13 May 1957.

See also
 1957 Indian presidential election

References

Vice-presidential elections in India
India
Uncontested elections